Kiprevo is a rural locality (a village) and the administrative center of Kiprevskoye Rural Settlement, Kirzhachsky District, Vladimir Oblast, Russia. The population was 538 as of 2010. There are 6 streets.

Geography 
Kiprevo is located 13 km northeast of Kirzhach (the district's administrative centre) by road. Yefremovo is the nearest rural locality.

References 

Rural localities in Kirzhachsky District